Push Any Button is the tenth studio album by American musician Sam Phillips. It was released in August 2013 by Littlebox Recordings.

Track listing

Personnel
Personnel sourced from the liner notes
 Sam Phillips – guitar, vocals
 Dave Palmer – piano, keyboards
 Benmont Tench – piano
 Chris Bruce – guitar
 Sebastian Steinberg – double bass
 Jennifer Condos – bass guitar
 Jay Bellerose – drums
 The Section Quartet 
 Eric Gorfain – violin, guitar, keyboards
 Daphne Chen – violin
 Lauren Chapman – viola
 Richard Dodd – cello

References

2013 albums
Sam Phillips (musician) albums